Lewis "Duke" Baltz (September 12, 1945 – November 22, 2014) was an American visual artist, photographer, and educator. He was an important figure in the New Topographics movement of the late 1970s. His best known work was monochrome photography of suburban landscapes and industrial parks which highlighted his commentary of void within the "American Dream".

He wrote for many journals, and contributed regularly to L'Architecture d'Aujourd'hui.

Baltz's work is held in the collections of the Solomon R. Guggenheim Museum, Metropolitan Museum of Art, Tate Modern, Los Angeles County Museum of Art, Whitney Museum of American Art, Art Institute of Chicago, Museum of Contemporary Art San Diego, Philadelphia Museum of Art, and San Francisco Museum of Modern Art.

Early life and education
Lewis Baltz was born on September 12, 1945 in Newport Beach, California. His father died when he was age 11.

Baltz graduated with a BFA degree in Fine Arts from San Francisco Art Institute in 1969; and held a Master of Fine Arts degree from Claremont Graduate School (now Claremont Graduate University).

Career 
His work is focused on searching for beauty in desolation and destruction. Baltz's images describe the architecture of the human landscape: offices, factories and parking lots. His pictures are the reflection of control, power, and influenced by and over human beings. His minimalistic photographs in the trilogy Ronde de Nuit, Docile Bodies, and Politics of Bacteria, picture the void of the other. In 1974 he captured the anonymity and the relationships between inhabitation, settlement and anonymity in The New Industrial Parks near Irvine, California (1974).

His books and exhibitions, his "topographic work", such as The New Industrial Parks, Nevada, San Quentin Point, Candlestick Point, expose the crisis of technology and define both objectivity and the role of the artist in photographs. His work Candlestick Point is made of 84 photographs documenting a public space near Candlestick Park, ruined by natural detritus and human intervention.

Baltz moved to Europe in the late 1980s and started to use large colored prints. 

He published several books of his work including Geschichten von Verlangen und Macht, with Slavica Perkovic (Scalo, 1986). Other photographic series, including Sites of Technology (1989–92), depict the clinical, pristine interiors of hi-tech industries and government research centres, principally in France and Japan. In 1995, the story Deaths in Newport was produced as a book and CD-ROM. Baltz also produced a number of video works.

Baltz taught at various institutions, including Claremont Graduate School, California Institute of the Arts (CalArts), University of California, Riverside (UC Riverside), California State University, San Bernardino, and the IUAV University in Venice, Italy, where in 2006 he co-founded the Arsenale Institute for Politics of Representation.

End of life, death and legacy 
In 2002, Baltz became a Professor for Photography at the European Graduate School in Saas-Fee, Switzerland. He lived his last years between Paris and Venice. Baltz died on November 22, 2014 in Paris at the age of 69 following a long illness.

Awards 
He received several scholarships and awards including a scholarship from the National Endowment For the Arts (1973, 1977), the John Simon Guggenheim Memorial Fellowship (1977), US-UK Bicentennial Exchange Fellowship (1980), and Charles Brett Memorial Award (1991).

Publications
Landscape: Theory, Lewis Baltz, Harry Callahan, Eliot Porter, Carol Digrappa and Robert Adams, 1980 
The New Industrial Parks Near Irvine, California, Lewis Baltz and Adam Weinburg, 2001 
The Deaths in Newport, onestar press, 2002
The Tract Houses: Die Siedlungshauser (English and German Edition), Lewis Baltz, 2005 
The Prototype Works, Lewis Baltz, 2010 
Mario Pfeifer: Reconsidering The new Industrial Parks near Irvine, California by Lewis Baltz, 1974, Lewis Baltz, Mario Pfeifer, Vanessa Joan Mueller,  2011 
Lewis Baltz: Candlestick Point, Lewis Baltz, 2011 
Lewis Baltz: Rule Without Exception / Only Exceptions, Lewis Baltz, 2012 
Lewis Baltz: Texts., Lewis Baltz, 2012 
Lewis Baltz, Lewis Baltz, 2017

Collections
Baltz's work is held in the following permanent collections:
Solomon R. Guggenheim Museum
Metropolitan Museum of Art
Tate Modern
Los Angeles County Museum of Art
Whitney Museum of American Art
Art Institute of Chicago
Museum of Contemporary Art San Diego
Philadelphia Museum of Art
San Francisco Museum of Modern Art

References

External links
Oral history interview with Lewis Baltz, 2009 Nov. 15–17 from the Smithsonian Archives of American Art
Lewis Baltz Faculty website at European Graduate School. (Biography, bibliography and articles)
George Eastman House Lewis Baltz Series
Lewis Baltz Archive, at the Getty Research Institute
Lewis Baltz notebooks and ephemera, at Getty Research Institute 

1945 births
2014 deaths
Photography academics
Photographers from California
Academic staff of European Graduate School
San Francisco Art Institute alumni
Claremont Graduate University alumni
20th-century American photographers
21st-century American photographers
New Topographics photographers
Pomona College faculty
American expatriates in Switzerland
California Institute of the Arts faculty
University of California, Riverside faculty